Heinz A. Richter (born 18 March 1939) is a German historian, known for his work on the   history of World War II in the Balkans, the history of modern Greece and the modern history of Cyprus.

Biography
Heinz A. Richter was born on 18 March 1939, in Heilbronn, in northern Baden-Württemberg, Germany. He started reading Greek mythology at a very young age and, in high school, his professor of History "excited his interest for classical Greek antiquity." Richter studied History, Political Science and English Literature at the Heidelberg University. He was professor of Greek and Cypriot modern history at the University of Mannheim from 1991 up to 2003.

In his book Griechenland im Zweiten Weltkrieg 1939-1941, Richter provided a narrative account of the war in the Balkans from the Greek and Allied side, using published sources only.

Richter has commented also on the current state of the affairs of Greece, as well as Cyprus.

Controversy
In November 2014, the University of Crete awarded Richter with an honoris Ph.D. for his historical work. The award provoked protests by some Greek historians and other academics who claimed that Richter, in his work, has "smeared" the reputation of Cretan resistance and assigned "noble incentives" to the Nazi invaders. Additionally, in an interview Richter gave to the Greek newspaper Kathimerini, he spoke of the destruction brought upon Greek islands and villages by "the Germans, the Italians, the communists and the nationalists", which some Greek commentators viewed as "moral relativism," assigning equal weight to the actions of the occupation forces and the local Greek guerrillas.

Richter rejected all the accusations against his work, stating that his duty as a historian is to relate what he "believe[s] to be the historical truth," and defending the point he made that "until Operation Mercury, World War Two had been a relatively 'clean' war, with both sides respecting the laws of war." The university's authorities initially declined the appeals made by Greek politicians and academics and rejected the claims of bias. Εventually, and after a formal, intra-university appeal, the university decided to remove his title in 2016.

Richter stated that he feels "honored" to be only the second German academic to ever have his academic title removed, the first being, as he claimed, Thomas Mann by the Nazis.

Τrial
In November 2015, Athens' public prosecutor indicted Richter under Art. 2 of "anti-racist" and "hate speech" law 4285/2014, for "denying  Nazi crimes against the people of Crete." On 10 February 2016, Richter, after being tried in absentia, was found innocent of all charges.

Awards
In 2000, Richter was presented by the Greek President Kostis Stephanopoulos, for his "exceptional acts, which raised the international prestige of Greece," with the Gold Cross of the Order of the Phoenix.

Selected works
 Griechenland: zwischen Revolution und Konterrevolution 1936–1946 (Greece: Between revolution and counter-revolution 1936-1946), Europäische Verlagsanstalt, Frankfurt, 1973; Δύo επαvαστάσεις και αvτεπαvαστάσεις στηv Eλλάδα 1936–1946 (Two revolutions and counter-revolutions in Greece 1936-1946), Exantas, Athens, 1977
 British Intervention in Greece: From Varkiza to Civil War, February 1945 – August 1946, Merlin Press, London, 1986; Η επέμβαση τωv Άγγλωv στηv Ελλάδα: Από τη Βάρκιζα στov Eμφύλιo Πόλεμo, Hestia, Athens, 1997 
 Griechenland im Zweiten Weltkrieg, August 1939 – Juni 1941 (Greece in the Second World War, August 1939 - June 1941) Syndikat, Bodenheim, 1997; Η Ιταλο–γερμανική επίθεση εναντίον της Ελλάδος (The Italian-German attack against Greece), Govostis, Athens, 1998–1999
 Operation Merkur: Die Eroberung der Insel Kreta im Mai 1941 (Operation Mercury: The Conquest of Crete in May 1941), Rutzen, Ruhpolding, 2011; Η μάχη της Κρήτης (The battle of Crete), Govostis, Athens, 2011

References

External links
Personal page at the University of Mannheim website
Bibliography
 "Some remarks on the political cultures of Greece, Cyprus and Turkey" : speech delivered at the Goethe Institute, Nicosia, Cyprus, 3 May 2012

1939 births
Heidelberg University alumni
Academic staff of the University of Mannheim
Historians of World War II
Living people
Gold Crosses of the Order of the Phoenix (Greece)
Historians of modern Greece